István Jenei (21 May 1953 – 25 February 2011) was a Hungarian sports shooter. He competed in the 50 metre running target event at the 1972 Summer Olympics.

References

1953 births
2011 deaths
Hungarian male sport shooters
Olympic shooters of Hungary
Shooters at the 1972 Summer Olympics
Sport shooters from Budapest
20th-century Hungarian people